Schouw is a surname. Notable persons with that name include:

 Gerard Schouw (born 1965), Dutch politician
 Joakim Frederik Schouw (1789–1852), Danish lawyer, botanist and politician